Trichatelais is a genus of beetles in the family Cerambycidae, containing the following species:

 Trichatelais chloropoda (Pascoe, 1865)
 Trichatelais fuscoantesignata (Breuning, 1953)
 Trichatelais invia (Pascoe, 1865)
 Trichatelais kaszabi (Breuning, 1975)
 Trichatelais purpurascens (Pascoe, 1865)

References

Apomecynini
Cerambycidae genera